Kevin Kehoe may refer to:
 Kevin Kehoe (hurler)
 Kevin Kehoe (politician)